Valee Taylor, known mononymously as Valee, is an American rapper known for his mixtape 1988 which got him signed to Kanye West's record label GOOD Music and Def Jam Recordings. He released GOOD Job, You Found Me on March 2, 2018. The first song he released was with Ty Money ("Cash Don't Bend").

Early life 
Valee Taylor grew up on Chicago's South Side, living in the Robert Taylor Homes and moving repeatedly once they were demolished. Valee has said his mother exposed him to musicians such as Erykah Badu, Sade, Jill Scott all at an early age. To this day, he still references the artists showed to him at a young age as heavily influential on his current music. Taylor was well trained as an auto mechanic and made money by working on people's automobiles from his mothers garage.

Throughout his schooling, he had repeated issues with anger and his outbursts led to him being kicked out of numerous schools. The rapper cites Cash Money, and Project Pat as early hip hop influences.

Taylor says he decided to make music on a whim while living in the South Side of Chicago. He says he was on his way to purchase a video game system, but on the way decided to go to Guitar Center instead. He purchased the necessary equipment to start making beats and shortly after he began rapping over them.

Music 
Valee's early work includes collaborations with producers such as Rio Mac and Chase the Money.

Between 2015 and 2017, Valee would go on to release five independent projects; 12:12 (2015), 1:11 (2016), 2:22 (2016), 12:12 Again (2016) and 1988 (2017).

Valee's first official commercial project was, GOOD Job, You Found Me EP, which was released in March 2018, and was executive produced by Kanye West. This EP received minimal attention from the mainstream, however Pitchfork reviewed the project and gave it a score of 7.4/10.

In May 2018, Valee released "Womp Womp", featuring Jeremih. The song was later featured on the soundtrack of the 2019 Netflix film Beats leading its debut at number 98 on the Billboard Canadian Hot 100 and at 24 on the Bubbling Under Hot 100.

In 2019, he released a surprise EP, Runnin Rich, which included features from G Herbo, King Louie, and Vic Mensa. The cover art is a picture of the rapper's pet dog, whom he was publicly condemned for dying red. Valee responded to the critics explaining he used "edible vegan dye" in order to color the pet's fur. He also released tracks with Big Baby DRAM ("About U"), Matt Ox ("Awesome"), and Lil Yachty ("Wombo") and appeared on YG's album 4Real 4Real.

Valee is currently managed by Andrew Barber, founder of notable Chicago Hip-Hop Blog: Fake Shore Drive.

Personal life 
Valee has two children and three dogs (Furrari, Ravioli and Sophia).

References

American rappers
Living people
Rappers from Chicago
1988 births
21st-century American rappers